The Proto Indo Europeans had a Smith God in their pantheon.  Although the name of a particular smith god cannot be linguistically reconstructed. Smith gods occur in nearly every Indo-European culture, with examples including the Hittite Hasammili, the Vedic Tvastr, the Greek Hephaestus, the Germanic Wayland, the Irish Goibniu, the Lithuanian Teliavelis and the Ossetian Kurdalagon and the Slavic Svarog. Mallory notes that "deities specifically concerned with particular craft specializations may be expected in any ideological system whose people have achieved an appropriate level of social complexity".

Crafting the weapon of the main God 
Nonetheless, two motifs recur frequently in Indo-European traditions: the making of the chief god's distinctive weapon (Indra’s and Zeus’ bolt; Lugh’s spear) by a special artificer

Drinking 
The craftsman god is associated with the immortals’ drinking.

Lameness 
Smith mythical figures share other characteristics in common. Hephaestus, the Greek god of blacksmiths, and Wayland the Smith, a nefarious blacksmith from Germanic mythology, are both described as lame.

Escape from the Island 

Additionally, Wayland the Smith and the Greek mythical inventor Daedalus both escape imprisonment on an island by fashioning sets of mechanical wings and using them to fly away.

See Also
 Vajra

Notes

References

Sources

Zaroff, Roman. "Organized pagan cult in Kievan Rus: The invention of foreign elite or evolution of local tradition? [Organizirani poganski kult v kijevski drzavi: Iznajdba tuje elite ali razvoj krajevnega izrocila?]". In: Studia mythologica Slavica. 2 (1999): 56-60. 10.3986/sms.v2i0.1844. 

Proto-Indo-European deities
Smithing gods
Metalsmiths